Steinmulen Shoulder is a rock shoulder extending north from Mount Zimmermann in the Gruber Mountains of the Wohlthat Mountains, Queen Maud Land. Discovered and plotted from air photos by German Antarctic Expedition, 1938–39. Replotted from air photos and surveys by Norwegian Antarctic Expedition, 1956–60, and named Steinmulen (the stone snout).

Ridges of Queen Maud Land
Princess Astrid Coast